Berry is an English, Irish and French surname. It is also an alternate spelling of Beri, a surname of Khatris originating from the Punjab region of the Northern Indian subcontinent.

Some of the first British Jewish families to emigrate to the United States had "Berry" as their surname. It comes from the Polish (eastern Ashkenazic) "Jagoda", which is Polish for "berry" (Anglicised; as a Jewish family name, it is one of the Slavic variants of the Hebrew biblical male proper name Yehuda (in English, Judah). Some other Jewish variants of the "Berry" surname are Perry, Berryman, Barry, etc.

Notable people with the surname include:
Albert Berry (disambiguation), several people
 Albert Berry (parachutist), claimed first parachute jump from an airplane
 Albert S. Berry (1836–1908), United States Representative from Kentucky
Alexander Berry (1781–1873), Scottish surgeon and Australian explorer
Alf Berry (1883–1945), English footballer
Amanda Berry (born 1986), victim of Ariel Castro kidnappings
Anthony Berry (1925–1984), British politician killed in Brighton hotel bombing
Arthur Berry (disambiguation), several people
 Arthur Berry (playwright) (1925–1994), English playwright, poet, teacher and artist
 Arthur Berry (footballer) (1888–1953), English amateur footballer
 Arthur Massey Berry (1888–1970), Canadian bush pilot
 Arthur Berry (politician) (1879–1943), politician in Manitoba, Canada
 Arthur Berry (cricketer) (1928–2016), New Zealand cricketer
Bertrand Berry, American NFL football player
Bill Berry (born 1958), American former drummer for the band R.E.M.
Bill Berry (trumpeter) (1930–2002), American jazz trumpeter
Bob Berry (cricketer) (1926–2006), English cricketer
Bob Berry (dendrologist), founder of Hackfalls arboretum, Tiniroto, New Zealand
Bruce Berry (disambiguation), several people
Carlotta Berry, American academic in the field of engineering
Charles A. Berry (1923–2020), American Flight Surgeon
Charles W. Berry (1871–1941), New York City Comptroller
Chu Berry (1908–1941), American jazz saxophonist
Chuck Berry (1926–2017), American musician and songwriter
Cicely Berry (1926–2018), British theatre director and vocal coach
Clarence Berry (1867–1930), American miner and oilman
Danielle Bunten Berry (1949–1998), computer game designer
Damien Berry (born 1989), American football player
 Dave Berry (Canadian football) (–2007), Canadian football player
 Dave Berry, mixed martial artist who fought in UFC 11
David Berry (disambiguation), several people
 David Berry (landowner) (1795–1889), Scottish livestock breeder in Australia
 David Berry (American musician) (born 1960), American songwriter and music producer
 Dave Berry (American football) (born c.1865), American football manager
 Dave Berry (musician) (born 1941), British musician
 David Berry (writer) (1943–2016), American playwright
 Dave Berry (footballer) (born 1945), English footballer
 David Berry (politician) (born 1951), Australian politician
 David Berry (inventor) (born 1978), American entrepreneur and venture capitalist
 Dave Berry (presenter) (born 1978), British television presenter and radio DJ
 David Berry (educator) (born 1960), English lecturer and writer
 David Berry (special effects artist), special effects artist
 David Berry (actor), Australian actor
Davion Berry (born 1991), American player in Israeli Basketball Premier League
Dennis Berry (director) (1944–2021), American film director, actor and screenwriter
Edward Berry (1768–1831), rear admiral, Royal Navy
Edward Wilber Berry (1875–1945), American paleontologist and botanist
Edwin S. Berry (1845–1934), surveyor and explorer in the Northern Territory of Australia
Elizabeth Williams Berry (1854–1969), Australian-American jockey and horse trainer
Eric Berry American football player; Kansas City Chiefs strong safety
Eric Berry (actor) (1913–1993), British stage and film actor
Erick Berry (1892–1974), American writer, illustrator and editor
Evan Berry (born 1995), American football player
Frederick Berry (1949–2018), American politician
Fred Berry (1951–2003), US actor
George Berry (disambiguation), several people, including
 George Berry (born 1997), drummer and producer for Bears in Trees
 George Berry (footballer) (born 1957), Welsh international football player
 Bill Berry (footballer, born 1904) (1904–1972), English footballer, known in France as George Berry
 George Berry (American football) (1900–1986), American football player
 George Berry (Australian politician) (1913–1998), Australian politician
 George Berry (captain) (1706–1776), French and Indian War captain
 George Berry (surgeon) (1853–1940), British eye surgeon and politician
 George J. Berry (born 1937), Commissioner of Industry, Trade, and Tourism for State of Georgia
 George L. Berry (1882–1948), president of the International Pressmen and Assistants' Union
 George Packer Berry (1898–1986), American medical educator
 George Ricker Berry (1865–1945), Semitic scholar and archaeologist
Gérard Berry (born 1948), French computer scientist
Graham Berry (1822–1904), Australian politician
Gwen Berry (born 1989), American hammer thrower
Halle Berry (born 1966), US actress
Jack Berry (1944–2003), Irish sportsperson
Jack Berry (journalist) (born 1931/1932), American sports journalist
Jacob Berry (born 2001), American baseball player
Jake Berry (born 1978), British politician
James Berry (disambiguation), several people
 James Berry, Puritan leader of Seat Pleasant, Maryland
 James Berry (artist) (1906–1979), New Zealand stamp and coin designer
 James Berry (barrister) (born 1983), British politician
 James Berry (executioner) (1852–1913), English executioner, 1884–1891
 James Berry (footballer) (born 2000), English footballer
 James Berry (major-general) (died 1691), fought in the English Civil War
 James Berry (poet) (1924–2017), Jamaican poet
 James Berry (surgeon) (1860–1946), British surgeon
 James Berry (writer) (1842–1914), Irish writer
 James Gomer Berry, 1st Viscount Kemsley (1883–1968), Welsh publisher
 James E. Berry (1881–1966), longest-serving Lieutenant Governor in Oklahoma
 James Henderson Berry (1841–1913), Governor and U.S. Senator of Arkansas
Jan Berry (1941–2004), American singer, songwriter and record producer, of Jan and Dean
 Jim Berry, of List of presidents of the United States Chess Federation
 Jim Berry (cartoonist) (1932–2015), American comic strip artist
 Jim Berry (hurler) (born 1989), Wexford hurler
 Jim Berry (news anchor) (born ), Miami news anchor
 Jim Berry (soccer) (born 1945), Canadian soccer player
Jarrod Berry (born 1998), Australian rules footballer
Joe Berry (second baseman) (1894–1976), Major League baseball player
Joe Berry (pitcher) (1904–1958), Major League baseball player
John Berry (disambiguation), several people
 John Berry (administrator) (born 1959), US Ambassador to Australia
 John Berry (arts administrator) (born 1961), British musician and arts administrator
 John Berry (congressman) (1833–1879), US Representative
 John Berry (cricketer) (1823–1895), British cricketer
 John Berry (film director) (1917–1999), American film director
 John Berry (illustrator) (1920–2009), British illustrator
 John Berry (Beastie Boys) (1963–2016), member of the Beastie Boys
 John Berry (New Jersey governor) (1619–1712), Deputy Governor of New Jersey
 John Berry (priest) (1849–1923), Church of England priest and Royal Navy chaplain
 John Berry (Royal Navy officer) (1635–1689/90), involved in the settlement of Newfoundland
 John Berry (rugby) (1866–1930), rugby union footballer
 John Berry (country singer) (born 1959), American country singer
 John Berry (speedway promoter) (1944–2012), England national team manager
 John Berry (zoologist) (1907–2002), Scottish zoologist and ecologist
 John Cutting Berry (1847–1936), American medical missionary to Japan
 John M. Berry (1827–1887), American jurist and politician
 John Stevens Berry, attorney
 John W. Berry (librarian) (born 1947), American librarian
 John W. Berry (psychologist), Canadian psychologist
 John Walter Berry (1868–1943), Canadian politician
 John Wesley Berry (1858–1931), Tacoma councilman
 Johnny Berry (1926–1994), Manchester United and England footballer
Jonathan Berry (born 1953), chess master
Joseph Flintoft Berry (1856–1931), Bishop of the Methodist Episcopal Church
Josephine Thorndike Berry (1871-1945), American educator, home economist
Judith Berry (born 1961), Canadian painter
Justin Berry, (born 1986), American pornographer
Keith Berry (musician) (born 1973), London-based musician and composer
Keith Berry (fighter) (born 1987), American mixed martial artist
Ken Berry (1933–2018), American actor, dancer and singer
Ken Berry (baseball) (born 1941), Major League baseball outfielder
Kevin Berry (1945–2006), Australian swimmer
Lillian Gay Berry (1872–1962), first female professor at Indiana University
Lisa Berry (1979- ), Canadian Actress
Marcellus Flemming Berry, inventor of the American Express Traveler's cheque
Martha Berry, founder of Berry College
Martia L. Davis Berry (1844-1894), American social reformer
Mary Berry (disambiguation), several people
Matt Berry, British actor, musician and writer
Matthew Berry (born 1969), American writer and fantasy sports analyst
Michael Berry (disambiguation), several people
 Michael Berry (athlete) (born 1991), American sprinter
 Michael Berry (physicist) (born 1941), British mathematical physicist
 Michael Berry (radio host) (born 1970), American talk show host
 Michael Berry, Baron Hartwell (1911–2001), newspaper proprietor and journalist
 Michael Berry Jr. (born 1964), British actor
Mike Berry (singer) (born 1942), English singer and actor
Montgomery P. Berry, American government official
Orville F. Berry (1852–1921), American lawyer, businessman and politician
Paula Berry (born 1969), American javelin thrower
Quintin Berry (born 1984), American baseball player and coach
Randy W. Berry (born 1965), American diplomat.
R. J. Berry (Robert James "Sam" Berry), British geneticist and Christian theorist
R. Stephen Berry (1931–2020), Professor of physical chemistry
Randall Berry, American engineer
Rashod Berry (born 1996), American football player
Richard Berry (disambiguation), several people
Richard Berry, 3rd Viscount Kemsley (born 1951), British peer
Richard Berry (actor) (born 1950), French actor
Richard Berry (missionary) (1824–1908), care worker in South Australia
Richard Berry (musician) (1935–1997), African-American singer
Richard Berry (scientist), British-Canadian chemist
Richard J. Berry (born 1962), American politician and mayor of Albuquerque, New Mexico
Richard N. Berry (1915–2018), American politician from Maine
Richard Nixon Berry (1873–1956), Canadian dentist and politician
Richard James Arthur Berry (1867–1962), British surgeon and professor of anatomy in Australia
Rick Berry (born 1978), Canadian ice hockey player
Rick Berry (artist) (born 1952), American expressionistic figurative artist
Ricky Berry (1964–1989), American basketball player
Robert Berry (disambiguation), several people
Robert Berry (born 1981), American art dealer
Robert Berry (born 1950), American guitarist
 Robert Berry (MP) (died 1618), MP for Ludlow (UK Parliament constituency)
 Robert Berry (runner) (1972–2014), died at the 2014 London Marathon
 Robert E. Berry, American food scientist
 Robert Edward Fraser Berry (1926–2011), Anglican bishop
 Robert Griffith Berry (1869–1945), Welsh minister
 Robert Mallory Berry, Arctic explorer
 Robert Marion Berry (born 1942), American politician
Rod Berry (1948–2013), American politician and lawyer
Ron Berry (1920–1997), Welsh writer
Ross Berry, American politician
Samuel Stillman Berry (1887–1984), US zoologist
Scott Berry, American college baseball coach
Sean Berry, former baseball player
Siân Berry, English politician
Sidney Bryan Berry (1926–2013), United States Army general
Tara Alisha Berry, Indian Actress
Thomas Berry, Catholic priest, historian, and self-described "earth scholar"
Tom Berry (South Dakota politician), Governor of South Dakota
Tom Berry (boxer) (1890–1943), English boxer of the 1910s, '20s and '30s
Tyrone Berry, English footballer
Walter Berry (basketball), US basketball player
Walter Berry (bass-baritone) (1929–2000), Austrian opera singer
Wendell Berry, writer and poet
William Berry (disambiguation), several people
 William Berry, 1st Viscount Camrose (1879–1954), British newspaper publisher
 William Berry (artist) (1933–2010), illustrator and professor at the University of Missouri
 William Berry (cricketer) (1897–1949), English cricketer
 William Berry (footballer, born 1867) (1867–1919), Scottish footballer
 William Berry (footballer, born 1934), English footballer
 William Berry (genealogist) (1774–1851), English genealogist
 William Berry (journalist) (1835–1903), New Zealand journalist and newspaper editor
 William Berry (Maine settler) (1753–1824), Revolutionary War soldier and Baptist deacon
 William Berry (pioneer) (1619–1654), First Settler of Hampton, New Hampshire
 William Berry (Roundhead) (c. 1605–1669), fought in English Civil War, MP
 William A. Berry (judge) (1915–2004), justice of the Oklahoma Supreme Court
 William D. Berry (artist) (1926–1979), Alaskan artist
 William D. Berry (political scientist), professor at Florida State University
 William H. Berry (1852–1928), Treasurer of Pennsylvania

See also
Justice Berry (disambiguation)

English-language surnames